C9orf64 (Chromosome 9 open reading frame 64) is a gene located on chromosome 9, that in humans encodes the protein queuosine salvage protein. The function and biological process of the queuosine salvage protein is a queuosine-nucleotide N-glycosylase/hydrolase (QNG1) that releases queuine from Q-5'-monophosphate, and this activity is required for
the salvage of queuine from exogenous Queuosine by S. pombe and HeLa
cells. Some evidence from orthologs indicates it may be involved in tRNA processing and recycling. The most common mRNA contains 4 coding exons, and it has 2 additional alternatively spliced exons. C9orf64 has been found in 5 different splice variants.

Expression of this gene is highest in the duodenum and small intestine, and it is also expressed in 24 other tissues.

22 variants have been annotated in the NIH Database, ClinVar, linked to disease conditions such as seizures, developmental delay, and muscular hypotonia.

Protein
Queuosine salvage protein is 341 amino acids long with a molecular weight of 39,029 Daltons and an isoelectric point of 5.61. It is a member of the DUF2419 superfamily. The DUF position on the human protein is from amino acid 53 to 341.
Bioinformatic tools at ExPASy predicted a second peroxisomal targeting signal. Crystal structures of wild-type human
QNG1 and QNG1 in complex with queuine have been deposited with the
Protein Data Bank under accession numbers 7UGK and 8DL3. The DUF position on the human protein is from amino acid 53 to 341.

Gene locus
C9orf64 is located on chromosome 9q21.32. The genes closest to C9orf64 on the long arm of chromosome 9 include GKAP1, KIF27, HNRNPK, RMI1, and a MicroRNA  MIR7-1.

Homology
C9orf64 is only found in eukaryotes. Orthologs have been found from primates to fungi and plants.

References

Further reading

External links